Fabulosos Calavera (Spanish for Fabulous Skull) Released in 1997 is the eleventh album by Argentine band Los Fabulosos Cadillacs. This album has a much darker theme than the previous album of the band talking about death, the devil and hidden messages. This fact, however, didn't stop it for getting gold disc and latter platinum on remastering and the Carlos Gardel Award. The best example of the tone of the album is the fourth track "Sábato", a tribute to Ernesto Sábato and his books El Túnel and Sobre Heroes y Tumbas, while track 11 is a homage to Argentine tango musician and composer Ástor Piazzolla. Track 7, "Hoy Lloré Canción", features famous salsa songwriter Rubén Blades.

Reception
The Allmusic review by Victor W. Valdivia awarded the album 4 stars stating "Arguably the most focused, self-assured record of their career, Fabulosos Calavera shows the Cadillacs incorporating the hardest, heaviest guitar rock they've ever played into their usual mélange of ska, reggae, Caribbean, and Latin rhythms... the songwriting is superbly honed -- there seem to be no fat or extraneous parts in any of the album's 13 tracks. "Surfer Calavera" mixes thrash, funk, reggae, and harmony vocals into the album's most infectious track... Rather than being distracting, however, such stylistic shifts enhance the energy and highlight the emotional contrasts of the music... Fabulosos Calavera demonstrates that it is possible to have fun and give listeners plenty to chew on motionally. 12 years into their career, they made their most successful record yet. ".

Track listing
 "El Muerto" ("The Deadman") (Flavio Cianciarulo)  – 4:05
 "Surfer Calavera" ("Skull Surfer") (Cianciarulo)  – 4:34
 "El Carnicero de Giles/Sueño" ("The Butcher of Giles/Dream") (Vicentico, Cianciarulo)  – 3:39
 "Sábato" (Cianciarulo)  – 4:40
 "Howen" (Fernando Ricciardi)  – 2:29
 "A Amigo J.V." ("To Friend J.V.") (Vicentico)  – 5:05
 "Hoy Lloré Canción" ("Today I Cried Song") (Cianciarulo, Rubén Blades)  – 4:00
 "Calaveras y Diablitos" ("Skulls and Little Devils") (Cianciarulo)  – 4:22
 "Il Pajarito" ("The Little Bird") (Vicentico)  – 3:17
 "Niño Diamante" ("Diamond Child") (Vicentico)  – 5:59
 "Piazzolla" (Cianciarulo)  – 4:20
 "Amnesia" (Sergio Rotman)  – 2:27
 "A.D.R.B. (En Busca Eterna)" ("A.D.R.B. (In Eternal Search)") (Vicentico)  – 6:01

Bonus tracks 
(Played at the end of Track 13)
 "Surfer Calavera (radio edit)"
 "Howen (radio edit)"

Personnel
 Vicentico – vocals
 Flavio Cianciarulo – bass
 Ariel Minimal – guitar
 Mario Siperman – keyboards
 Fernando Ricciardi – drums
 Sergio Rotman – alto saxophone
 Daniel Lozano – trumpet & flugelhorn
 Fernando Albareda – trombone
 Gerardo Rotblat – percussion

Additional Personnel
 Rubén Blades - vocals on "Hoy Lloré Canción"

Sales and certifications

External links
Los Fabulosos Cadillacs Official Web Site
Fabulosos Calavera at MusicBrainz
[ Fabulosos Calavera] at Allmusic
Fabulosos Calavera at Discogs

References 

1997 albums
Los Fabulosos Cadillacs albums
RCA Records albums
Grammy Award for Best Latin Rock, Urban or Alternative Album